The Duncan Grant Ranch was established by Scottish immigrant Duncan Grant in Platte County, Wyoming in the 1870s. It is a representative example of an immigrant homestead ranch of the late 1800s.

The Duncan Grant Ranch was placed on the National Register of Historic Places on February 27, 2013.

References

External links
 Duncan Grant Ranch Rural Historic Landscape at the Wyoming State Historic Preservation Office

		
National Register of Historic Places in Platte County, Wyoming
Ranches on the National Register of Historic Places in Wyoming